Michigan's Adventure is a  amusement park in Muskegon County, Michigan, about halfway between Muskegon and Whitehall. It is the largest amusement park in the state and has been owned and operated by Cedar Fair since 2001. As of 2022, Michigan's Adventure has 37 rides, more than any other park in the state.

The park also includes an outdoor water park, WildWater Adventure. The park is headlined by seven roller coasters, including Shivering Timbers, a wooden coaster, and a suspended looping coaster, Thunderhawk.

History
The park was founded as Deer Park in 1956 by L.R. Beardsley, Dr. E.S. Gillam, Hardin Dey and Martin Kasichke. The park originally featured a petting zoo with deer, llamas, monkeys, chickens and ducks, as well as a children's area called Storybook Lane. The first ride was built in 1958, an Alan Herschell 16-gauge train called the Deer Park Special.

In 1968, Roger Jourden purchased the park from then-owner Benny Bensinger for $115,000. After purchasing attractions, the park was eventually renamed Deer Park Funland in 1972. That same year, he added the first three flat rides: Tilt-a-Whirl, Merry-Go-Round and Ferris Wheel. Every few years he would add a few more attractions, with the Scrambler opening in 1975. 1976, the park's 20th anniversary, introduced the Spider, a car ride named Mutley's Putt Putts, and two rides for children.

The park's first roller coaster opened in 1979, a standard model Corkscrew from Arrow Development. The park continued their relationship with Arrow when in 1983 they introduced Logger's Run, an Arrow Hydroflume. The Chance-manufactured Sea Dragon opened in 1987, along with a new C.P. Huntington Train circling the park. 1987 also marked the final year for the Spider, which was sold to Michael Jackson for his Neverland Ranch complex.

Transition to Michigan's Adventure

The 1988 season marked a huge transition for Deer Park Funland, most notably the introduction of a new general manager, Roger's daughter Camille Jourden-Mark, as well as a new name, Michigan's Adventure. The largest change on the midway that year was the introduction of the Wolverine Wildcat wooden roller coaster, the first coaster manufactured by the Dinn & Summers partnership. The park also introduced a Chance Thunderbolt, two live shows and a new entrance.

In 1989, the Giant Gondola Wheel replaced the Ferris Wheel, and the Falling Star and Trabant made their debut past Logger's Run. The park introduced WildWater Adventure in 1990 in order to compete with a popular waterpark in Norton Shores called Pleasure Island (Pleasure Island closed in 1997). WildWater Adventure originally featured eight water slides, a wave pool, a children's play area and a lazy river.

Over the next few years, the park introduced several popular flat rides, such as the replacement of the Merry-Go-Round by the Grand Carousel in 1991 and the Flying Trapeze in 1992. Mammoth River made its debut in the waterpark in 1993, and the park's third coaster, the junior wooden coaster Zach's Zoomer, opened in 1994, replacing the C.P. Huntington Train (though a new one would open up near Wolverine Wildcat and presently shuttles people to the north side of the park). Adventure Falls, a classic shoot-the-chutes water ride, opened in 1995 at the back of the park past Wild Water Adventure. 1996 saw the introduction of Chaos and a new Tilt-a-Whirl, both located behind Logger's Run.

The waterpark was expanded with a "Phase Two" in 1997, including two more wave pools, two children's play areas, a second large raft slide, and three more tube slides. The new additions doubled both the size and capacity of the waterpark. Also that year the park's miniature golf course, Rocky Point Mini Golf, opened on the lake.

The most notable change in 1997 was the start of construction on a third wooden roller coaster, Shivering Timbers. When the ride opened in 1998, it was quickly considered one of the world's best wooden roller coasters. Early into the 1998 season, however, the Late-May 1998 Tornado Outbreak and Derecho damaged the Mutley's Putt Putts ride as well as a small children's ride named Drummer Boy, uprooting a lot of the trees in the park.

The park began a five-year expansion program in 1999 with the introduction of a new entrance on the site formerly occupied by Mutley's Putt Putts, a new ticketing system, and three new rides. The first to open on July 10, 1999, was the Big Dipper, the park's fifth roller coaster. Shortly after that in August the park's sixth coaster, Mad Mouse as well as an S&S Frog Hopper opened on the site where the previous entrance once stood. The Scrambler attraction was also moved near Frog Hopper to make room for future additions. The first annual TimbersFest was also held in June 1999.

In 1999, Michigan's Adventure was planning to build a 210-foot steel roller coaster according to a height variance. This coaster was projected to cost around $7,000,000. There were other permits filled at that time, including a convenience store/gas station and a new parking lot. In addition to those proposed projects, the park was also working on plans for a campground and a 300-room hotel. However, these proposals never went through.

For the year 2000, the park planned on adding two new attractions. Speed Splashers, a children's boat ride, opened near the Big Dipper, with the second attraction being an electric car ride named Be-Bop Blvd. However, Be-Bop Blvd. did not open in 2000, due to a number of construction-related delays.

Transition to Cedar Fair
In 2001, Cedar Fair purchased Michigan's Adventure for $28,000,000. Larry MacKenzie replaced Camille Jourden-Mark as general manager to help the park through the transition, but he would soon leave for Valleyfair at the end of the year, bringing Jourden-Mark back as general manager. The season's only new attraction would be the short-lived Royal Hannerford Circus.

In 2002, the park introduced $5,000,000 worth of new rides, attractions and improvements. Eight new attractions were installed including the park's tallest ride, RipCord, as well as introducing the Peanuts characters and the state's largest Snoopy Boutique. 2004 introduced Swan Boats, moved from Cedar Point where they were removed for the pond turnaround on Maverick, and in 2005 the park introduced a new water slide named ProSlide Tornado, Funnel of Fear. In 2006, for the park's 50th anniversary, a new white water rafting ride called Grand Rapids opened in a previously un-developed area past Adventure Falls. The renovation also included a new 50's themed restaurant called Coasters, which is located at many Cedar Fair parks, as well as a new train station named Grand Rapids Junction.

In 2008, Michigan's Adventure opened the state's first suspended looping coaster, Thunderhawk, which was moved from sister park Geauga Lake after it closed. Thunderhawk was the first new roller coaster in Michigan's Adventure since 1999. In 2010, Bumper Boats were added just north of Logger's Run, after previously operating at Valleyfair. In 2011, Michigan's Adventure introduced an attraction in the water park, Beach Party, featuring the world's first giant geyser, blasting water  into the air as well as 150 different interactive water-related features. For the 2012 season, the park is focusing on new offerings, including some new food choices, VIP Tours, and the Fast Lane system. Just prior to the 2012 season, the Falling Star ride was removed from the park due to declining ridership and so future growth could be made. After 2008, it became an open secret that after Thunderhawk was added, Michigan's Adventure not only set attendance records, but also has brought in one of the highest profit margins in the Cedar Fair chain. This explains Michigan's Adventure's lack of new rides since 2009.

On December 13, 2012, Michigan's Adventure announced that they would be making an announcement for a new attraction at the park for 2013 on December 17, 2012. Along with that announcement came a Haiku that read  "the four elements, only one will master, summer, please come soon." On December 17, 2012, Michigan's Adventure announced their intent to build a flying scooter ride at the park named Lakeside Gliders, which opened in May 2013. In addition, the park opened up the Lakeside Beer Garden immediately adjacent to the Lakeside Gliders ride on the lake for 2013. This marks the final park in the Cedar Fair chain to be able to serve alcohol.

On August 11, 2019, the Be-Bop Blvd car ride closed permanently. Four days later the park announced a Camp Snoopy kids area would be built for 2020, and will contain five new rides including a family coaster. But that year, the park was shut down on grounds of COVID-19 pandemic.

Current rides and attractions

Roller coasters

Thrill rides

Family rides

Kids rides

Water rides

Other attractions
 Rocky Point Mini Golf, upcharge attraction. A mini golf course along the lake. This course is designed for families, but also features many difficult water hazards and sand pits.
 Beagle Scout Acres. A Playground in Camp Snoopy that opened in 2021.

WildWater Adventure water park

WildWater Adventure, opened in 1990, is Michigan's Adventure's water park. After the addition of the WildWater Adventure, the slogan for the park became "2 parks for the price of 1" since the regular gate admission allows full day usage of both the amusement and the water park, rather than a separate fee for both.

Fast Lane queuing

Fast Lane is Michigan's Adventure's virtual queue system. For $45 visitors get a wrist band that enables them to get to the front of the line without queuing on 14 of the most popular attractions.

Festivals
 The park formerly hosted Timberfest, a festival targeted at roller coaster enthusiasts, featuring early admission and extended ride time. Timbersfest ran from 1999 to 2009.
 The park also hosted Rock the Coast, a Christian music mini-festival, in May. It is organized by Alive on the Lakeshore, the organization which created the Unity Christian Music Festival.
Tricks and Treats Fall Fest was added in 2023 and is a Halloween family event.

Awards
 In 2007 Michigan's Adventure won the tourist attraction of the year award in the state of Michigan.
 Shivering Timbers has been rated in the top 10 wooden roller coasters by Amusement Today since its debut in their annual Golden Ticket Awards.
 Shivering Timbers and Thunderhawk have earned places in the top 50 coasters in the world on Coasterforce.

Logo and slogan

Logo
The original Michigan's Adventure logo featured a cartoon lion. When Cedar Fair acquired the park in 2001, they replaced the lion with Snoopy from Peanuts, who appears on the logos of other Cedar Fair parks. The logo was changed twice in 2007; once to reflect Michigan's Adventure's part in the Cedar Fair chain, and again to re-add Snoopy. After Cedar Fair's acquisition of the Paramount Parks, all of their parks were given new logos featuring the same font and style which has been popularized by Cedar Point (with the trademark flag-dotted-"i").

Slogans
 1956-1972 - "Fun, Fun, FunLand!"
 1979-1987 (estimated) "It's the Good Time Place"  (while operating under Deer Park Funland name) 
 1991-2009 - "2 Parks For The Price Of 1!" 
"Twice the Fun!"
 2010–2011 - "The Fun And Only!"
 2012 - "Thrills Connect"
 2018 - "It's Amazing Here!"

Incidents
 The park's Gondola Wheel once malfunctioned prior to Cedar Fair ownership, and an aerial truck from the Norton Shores Fire Department had to rescue people from the top compartments of the ride.
 On June 30, 2000, a 38-year-old woman turning to photograph her relatives in the cars behind her fell out of Zach's Zoomer and was critically injured. As she fell off, she was struck by a wooden support beam. Paramedics found the woman unconscious, and she was transported to Hackley Hospital in critical condition. She suffered rib fractures and other internal injuries.
 On July 27, 2001, the rotating, wheel-shaped portion of the Chaos ride collapsed with 33 passengers aboard, stranding them for several hours. 31 were taken to local area hospitals, and most were released by the following afternoon.  An investigation found that bolts were loose and subsequently bent and broke during the ride's operation.
 On July 11, 2014, chlorine gas was released into an area of the WildWater Adventure water park. 27 park visitors were treated and hosed off at the park, while 28 patients were taken to Mercy Health hospitals. All patients were released without any life threatening injuries.
 On May 29, 2017, Thunderhawk's emergency safety mechanism shut down the ride for 90 minutes after a lift motor malfunctioned. One train was in the station, while another was moving on the track. No one was injured.
 On June 19, 2021, a train with guests on the Shivering Timbers ride was stopped by the ride's computer on the final emergency brakes set on the brake run after slipping past the first set due to persistent rain. Maintenance arrived shortly on the scene and deactivated the E-Stop. This caused the emergency brakes to disengage and released the stopped train, thus colliding with the second empty train in the station. The collision was not at high speed, and none of the guests faced severe injuries. The ride was closed afterward for two weeks to repair and reinforce the damaged track caused by the collision. The ride was later reopened on July 3, 2021, with only one train in operation.[citation needed] The ride has since gone back to having two trains in operation for the 2022 season.

References

External links

 
 

 
Amusement parks in Michigan
Cedar Fair amusement parks
Tourist attractions in Muskegon County, Michigan
1956 establishments in Michigan
Buildings and structures in Muskegon County, Michigan
Amusement parks opened in 1956